Nong Pladuk Junction railway station is a railway station in Nong Kop Sub-district, Ban Pong District, Ratchaburi. It is on the Southern Line, and is the junction of minor branch lines, the Nam Tok Line (Death Railway) and Suphan Buri Line.

History 
Nong Pladuk Junction railway station was opened in June 19, 1903 as part of the first phase of the Southern Line construction between Thon Buri and Phetchaburi.

Burma Railway

During the Second World War, Nong Pladuk Junction became the start of the Death Railway, which ended Thanbyuzayat in Burma. Construction of the railway was coordinated by the Imperial Japanese Army, permitted to build due to an armistice signed with Thailand. Camp Nong Pladuk was constructed near the junction station to serve as a transit camp. On 16 September 1942, construction started at both ends of the planned railway line. At the end of the war, the railway was confiscated by the British, who later sold it to the State Railway of Thailand.

In June 1963, a railway line from Nong Pladuk was opened to Suphan Buri by Sarit Thanarat.

Train services 
 Ordinary 261/262 Bangkok–Hua Hin–Bangkok
 Local 485/486 Nong Pladuk–Nam Tok–Nong Pladuk
 Commuter 355/356 Bangkok–Suphan Buri–Bangkok
 Ordinary 251/252 Bang Sue Junction–Prachuap Khiri Khan–Bang Sue Junction
 Ordinary 254/255 Lang Suan–Thon Buri–Lang Suan
 Ordinary 257/258 Thon Buri–Nam Tok–Thon Buri
 Ordinary 259/260 Thon Buri–Nam Tok–Thon Buri
 Ordinary 351/352 Thon Buri–Ratchaburi–Thon Buri

References 

 
 
 
 
 

Railway stations in Thailand
Buildings and structures in Ratchaburi province
Railway stations opened in 1903